Anchialus Glacier is the 8.5 km long and 3.4 km wide glacier in Sostra Heights on the east side of northern Sentinel Range in Ellsworth Mountains, Antarctica.  It is situated north of lower Embree Glacier, east of Sabazios Glacier, south of lower Newcomer Glacier and northwest of Vit Ice Piedmont.  The glacier drains the northeast slopes of Mount Malone and the west slopes of Bracken Peak, flows northwards and joins Newcomer Glacier east of Mount Lanning.

The glacier is named after the ancient town of Anchialus in Southeastern Bulgaria.

Location
US mapping in 1961.

See also
 List of glaciers in the Antarctic
 Glaciology

Maps
 Newcomer Glacier.  Scale 1:250 000 topographic map.  Reston, Virginia: US Geological Survey, 1961.
 Antarctic Digital Database (ADD). Scale 1:250000 topographic map of Antarctica. Scientific Committee on Antarctic Research (SCAR). Since 1993, regularly updated.

References
 Anchialus Glacier SCAR Composite Gazetteer of Antarctica
 Bulgarian Antarctic Gazetteer. Antarctic Place-names Commission. (details in Bulgarian, basic data in English)

External links
 Anchialus Glacier. Copernix satellite image

Glaciers of Ellsworth Land
Bulgaria and the Antarctic